Sir Branford Mayhew Taitt, KA (May 15, 1938 – February 15, 2013) was a Barbadian politician who served as a cabinet minister and former President of the Senate of Barbados. He served as Minister of Trade, Industry and Commerce from 1971 to 1976, Minister of Tourism and Industry from 1986 to 1987, Minister of Health from 1987 to 1993, and Minister of Foreign Affairs from 1993 to 1994. Taitt was the longest serving Minister of Health in the country's history.

Taitt was born in 1938 on Fairfield Road in Black Rock, Saint Michael, Barbados. He was the youngest of the five children of Clair Rollock and Elma Taitt-Rollock. He attended Wesley Hall Boys' School and Combermere School. Taitt later obtained a bachelor's degree bachelor's degree cum laude from Brooklyn College and a master's degree in public administration from New York University.

References

External links
Curriculum Vitae of Branford Taitt

1938 births
2013 deaths
Foreign Ministers of Barbados
Health ministers of Barbados
Industry ministers of Barbados
Trade ministers of Barbados
Tourism ministers of Barbados
Presidents of the Senate of Barbados
Members of the House of Assembly of Barbados
Leaders of the Democratic Labour Party (Barbados)
Democratic Labour Party (Barbados) politicians
Robert F. Wagner Graduate School of Public Service alumni
Brooklyn College alumni
People from Saint Michael, Barbados
Knights and Dames of St Andrew (Barbados)